The 12th Army was a field army of the Imperial Russian Army during World War I that fought on the Eastern Front.

Its field headquarters was established in January 1915.
In August 1915, the entire staff of the 12th Army was replaced by that of the 13th Army, which itself ceased to exist.
The unit was assigned to the Northwestern Front and later to the Northern Front, being disbanded by the end of 1917.

Commanders

From 29 December 1917 to April 1918, the 12th Army was nominally commanded by a board of:

 D. K. Guntsadze 
 S. M. Nakhimson

Organisation
At the end of the war, the field army included:

 Field Staff
 13th Army Corps
 43rd Army Corps
 49th Army Corps
 2nd Siberian Army Corps
 6th Siberian Army Corps
 12th Army mobile air base

See also
List of Russian armies in World War I
List of Imperial Russian Army formations and units

References

Armies of the Russian Empire
Military units and formations established in 1915
1915 establishments in the Russian Empire
Military units and formations disestablished in 1917